The Clitunno, in Antiquity the Clitumnus, is a river in Umbria, Italy. The name is of uncertain origin, but it was also borne by the river god. The Clitunno rises from a spring within a dozen metres of the ancient Via Flaminia near the town of Campello sul Clitunno between Spoleto and Trevi.

The spring was well described by Pliny the Younger who records his visit toward the end of the first century AD:

Virgil mentions the site too in Book II of his Georgics where he celebrates ". . . the milk-white herds of the Clitumnus, those bulls that often bathed in the river's sacred stream, the noblest of the victims Romans sacrifice at their triumphs . . ."

It was visited by Caligula and by the emperor Honorius. It was also celebrated as a great beauty spot by Byron and Giosuè Carducci; in the 19th century it was planted with willows, and zealously monitored for pollution. It is open today as a paying tourist attraction.

The Clitunno then flows, generally north, through the east Umbrian plain, past the church of the so-called Temple of Clitumnus and the towns of Pissignano, Cannaiola and Trevi, to join the Timia, a tributary of the Topino, near Bevagna. Though its current is usually sluggish, it is subject, like many other rivers in the east Umbrian plain, to sudden flooding. It was only tamed completely in the 19th century, and is largely banked by levees.

The Temple of Clitumnus, later a church, lies on its bank.

References

External links

Rivers of the Province of Perugia
Rivers of Italy